David E. Poisson (born September 3, 1951) is an American politician. He served in the Virginia House of Delegates 2006–10, representing the 32nd district in Loudoun County. He is a member of the Democratic Party. Poisson served on the House committees on Agriculture, Chesapeake and Natural Resources (2006–07), Counties, Cities and Towns (2008–2009), and Militia, Police and Public Safety (2006–2009).

Electoral history

References

External links
 (campaign finance)

1951 births
Living people
Democratic Party members of the Virginia House of Delegates
Virginia lawyers
University of Massachusetts Amherst alumni
University of Arizona alumni
People from Sterling, Virginia
21st-century American politicians